In mathematics, the Parseval–Gutzmer formula states that, if  is an analytic function on a closed disk of radius r with Taylor series

then for z = reiθ on the boundary of the disk,

which may also be written as

Proof 

The Cauchy Integral Formula for coefficients states that for the above conditions:

where γ is defined to be the circular path around origin of radius r. Also for  we have:  Applying both of these facts to the problem starting with the second fact:

Further Applications 
Using this formula, it is possible to show that

   

where 

This is done by using the integral

References 

Theorems in complex analysis